Riau Malay (Jawi: بهاس ملايو رياو, Bahasa Melayu Riau) is a variety of the Malay language spoken in the Indonesian province of Riau.

Dialects
Riau Malay has five main dialects, which consist of:
Kuantan
Pangaraian
Pesisir (Coastal)
Rokan Hilir
Siak

References

External links
 
 
 
 
 
 
 
 

Languages of Indonesia
Malay language
Riau